Mary Somerset, Duchess of Beaufort may refer to:

Mary Somerset, Duchess of Beaufort (gardener) (1630-1715), who introduced a number of exotic plants to British gardens
Mary Somerset, Duchess of Beaufort (sportswoman) (1897-1987), a relative of the British royal family